Khanian or Khaneyan or Khaniyan may refer to:
 Khanian, East Azerbaijan, a village in Iran
 Khanian, Mazandaran, a village in Iran
 Khanian, Mansehra, a village in Pakistan

See also 
 Kanian (disambiguation)